Albania (ALB) competed at the 2020 Summer Olympics in Tokyo, Japan, represented by the Albanian National Olympic Committee (KOKSH). Originally scheduled to take place from 24 July to 9 August 2020, the Games were postponed to 23 July to 8 August 2021, because of the COVID-19 pandemic.

Up to this point, the nation had participated in the Summer Olympic Games on eight occasions since its first appearance in 1972. A total of nine athletes, six men and three women, were selected by the national committee to compete in six sports.

Four athletes qualified based on their results, including track star Luiza Gega, who won Gold at the 2018 Mediterranean Games in the 3000m steeplechase run. It was her second participation at the Summer Olympics.   

In weightlifting, Albania competed with two men. Briken Calja, the European Weightlifting Champion from 2018, competed in the Men's 73 kg category, while Erkand Qerimaj competed in the Men's 81 kg competition. 
The best result was achieved by Birken Calja, who finished 4th after lifting 342kg. This marks Albania's highest finishing position at an event in their history at the Summer Olympics. 

Another notable achievement came from Luiza Gega, who qualified for the Finals in Athletics, being the first athlete to do so. In the end, she finished the finals in 13th, with a time of 9:34.10.

Despite significant improvements from previous Olympics, Albania remains without an Olympic medal.

Background 

Prior to the 2020 games, Albania had sent a delegation to eight Summer Olympic Games. The Albanian National Olympic Committee (KOKSH) was recognized by the International Olympic Committee (IOC) on 1 January 1959. The nation made its debut appearance at the 1972 Summer Olympics in Munich, Germany, and missed the following editions, before returning for the 1992 Summer Olympics in Barcelona, Spain.

Competitors 

The following table lists the number of competitors for Albania in the 2020 Summer Olympics. The nation's team for the 2020 games was composed of six male and three female competitors, including athletes Izmir Smajlaj and Luiza Gega, gymnast Matvei Petrov, judoka Indrit Cullahj, shooter Manuela Delilaj, swimmers Kledi Kadiu and Nikol Merizaj as well as weightlifters Briken Calja and Erkand Qerimaj.

Athletics 

Albanian athletes further achieved the entry standards, by world ranking (one female) or by Universality place (one man), in the following track and field events (up to a maximum of 3 athletes in each event):

Track & road events

Field events

Gymnastics

Artistic 
Albania received an invitation from the Tripartite Commission to send a male gymnast to the Games, marking the country's debut in the sport. Matvei Petrov entered the men's pommel horse and finished tenth in the qualification round, failing to qulify for the final but being listed as first reserve.

Judo 

Albania entered one male judoka into the Olympic tournament after International Judo Federation awarded them a tripartite commission quota.

Shooting 

Albania was represented by Manuela Delilaj in the shooting tournament of the 2020 Summer Olympics. The nation received an invitation from the Tripartite Commission (TC) to send a women's air pistol shooter to the games, as long as the minimum qualifying score (MQS) was fulfilled by June 2021. Delilaj competed in the women's 10 m air pistol category on 25 July 2021 and was ranked 37 overall.

Swimming 

Albania was represented by Kledi Kadiu and Nikol Merizaj in the swimming tournament of the 2020 Summer Olympics. The nation received a universality invitation from International Swimming Federation (FINA) to send two top-ranked swimmers in their respective individual events to the games based on the federation's points system of July 2021. Kadiu competed in the men's 100 m freestyle category on 27 July 2021 and was ranked 52 overall. Following this on 30 July, Merizaj participated in the women's 50 m freestyle category and eventually finished 42 overall.

Weightlifting 

Albania will be represented by Briken Calja and Erkand Qerimaj in the weightlifting tournament of the 2020 Summer Olympics. The nations weightlifters qualified for two quota places based on the 2020 rankings qualification list of June 2021. Calja competed in the men's 73kg category on 28 July 2021 and was ranked fourth overall, narrowly missing out the country's first ever olympic medal.

References 

2021 in Albanian sport
2020
Albania